The Cathedral Basilica of St Stanislaus and St Ladislaus of Vilnius (also known as Vilnius Cathedral; ; , historical: Kościół Katedralny św. Stanisława) is the main Catholic cathedral in Lithuania. It is situated in Vilnius Old Town, just off Cathedral Square. Dedicated to the Christian saints Stanislaus and Ladislaus, the church is the heart of Catholic spiritual life in Lithuania.

The coronations of the Grand Dukes of Lithuania took place within its confines. Inside its crypts and catacombs are buried many famous people from Lithuanian and Polish history including Vytautas (1430), his wife Anna (1418), his brother Sigismund (Žygimantas) (1440), his cousin Švitrigaila (1452), Saint Casimir (1484), Alexander Jagiellon (1506), and two wives of Sigismund II Augustus: Elisabeth of Austria (1545) and Barbara Radziwiłł (1551). The heart of the Polish king and Grand Duke of Lithuania Władysław IV Vasa was buried there upon his death, although the rest of his body is buried at the Wawel Cathedral in Kraków.

Inside, there are more than forty works of art dating from the 16th through 19th centuries, including frescoes and paintings of various sizes. During the restoration of the cathedral, the altars of a presumed pagan temple and the original floor, laid during the reign of King Mindaugas, were uncovered. In addition, the remains of the cathedral built in 1387 were also located. A fresco dating from the end of the 14th century, the oldest known fresco in Lithuania, was found on the wall of one of the cathedral's underground chapels.

During the Soviet regime, initially the cathedral was converted into a warehouse. Masses were celebrated again starting in 1988, although the cathedral was still officially called The Gallery of Images at that time. In 1989, its status as a cathedral was restored.

History

It is believed that in pre-Christian times, the Baltic pagan god Perkūnas was worshipped at the site of the cathedral. It has also been postulated that the Lithuanian King Mindaugas ordered the construction of the original cathedral in 1251 after his conversion to Christianity and appointment of a bishop to Lithuania. Remains of the archaic quadratic church with three naves and massive buttresses have been discovered underneath the current structure in the late 20th century. After Mindaugas's death in 1263, the first cathedral again became a place of pagan worship.

In 1387, the year in which Lithuania was officially converted to Christianity, construction began on a second Gothic Cathedral with five chapels. This second cathedral, however, burnt down in 1419. During preparations for his 1429 coronation as King of Lithuania, Vytautas built a significantly larger Gothic Cathedral in its place. Although the coronation never took place, the walls and pillars of this third Cathedral have survived to this day. The third Cathedral had three naves and four circular towers at its corners, and Flemish traveler Guillebert de Lannoy noticed its similarity to Frauenburg Cathedral. In 1522, the cathedral was renovated, and a bell tower was built on top of the Lower Castle defensive tower. After another fire in 1530, it was rebuilt again and between 1534 and 1557 more chapels and the crypts were added. The cathedral acquired architectural features associated with the Renaissance.

In 1529, the Crown Prince and future King of Poland, Sigismund II Augustus, was crowned Grand Duke of Lithuania in the cathedral. The Lithuanian monarchs were being inaugurated in the Vilnius Cathedral until 1569 by placing the Gediminas' Cap on their heads. After yet another fire in 1610, the cathedral was rebuilt again, and the two front towers were added. The cathedral was damaged again in 1655 when Vilnius fell to Russian troops in the Russo-Polish War of 1654–1667. It was renovated and redecorated several more times.

Between 1623 and 1636, at the initiative of Sigismund III Vasa and later completed by his son Wladyslaw IV Vasa, the Baroque style Saint Casimir chapel by royal architect Constantino Tencalla was built of Swedish sandstone. Its interior was reconstructed in 1691–1692 and decorated with frescoes by Michelangelo Palloni, the altar and stuccowork by Pietro Perti. This chapel contains sculpted statutes of Jagiellon kings and an epitaph with Wladyslaw IV Vasa's heart. More than anything in the Cathedral this chapel symbolizes the glory of Polish-Lithuanian union and common history.

In 1769 the southern tower, built during the reconstruction of 1666 collapsed, destroying the vaults of the neighbouring chapel and killing 6 people. After the damage, Bishop of Vilnius Ignacy Jakub Massalski ordered the reconstruction of the cathedral. The works started in 1779 and were completed in 1783, and the interior was completed in 1801. The cathedral was reconstructed to its present appearance according to the design of Laurynas Gucevičius in the Neoclassical style; the church acquired a strict quadrangular shape common to local public buildings. The main facade was adorned with sculptures of the Four Evangelists by Italian sculptor Tommaso Righi. Some scholars point to the architectural resemblance of the cathedral to the works of Andrea Palladio or see the influence of Gucevičius's tutor Claude Nicolas Ledoux. The influence of Palladian architecture is evident in side facades of the building. The lack of 'purity' of the Classical architecture, due to incorporation of Baroque style sculptures and other elements, was later criticized by academical architects, notably Karol Podczaszyński.

Between 1786 and 1792 three sculptures by Kazimierz Jelski were placed on roof of the Cathedral - Saint Casimir on the south side, Saint Stanislaus on the north, and Saint Helena in the centre. These sculptures were removed in 1950 and restored in 1997. Presumably the sculpture of St. Casimir originally symbolized Lithuania, that of St. Stanislaus symbolized Poland, and that of St. Helena holding a 9 m-golden cross represents the true cross.

In 2002 work officially began to rebuild the Royal Palace of Lithuania behind the cathedral. The newly erected palace building will considerably alter the context of the cathedral.

The cathedral and the belfry were thoroughly renovated from 2006 to 2008. The facades were covered with fresh multicolor paintwork, greatly enhancing the external appearance of the buildings. It was the first renovation since the restoration of Lithuania's independence in 1990.

In January 1989, remains of Albertas Goštautas were discovered in the Vilnius Cathedral wall.

Gallery

References

Roman Catholic churches completed in 1783
18th-century Roman Catholic church buildings in Lithuania
Roman Catholic cathedrals in Lithuania
Basilica churches in Lithuania
Rebuilt buildings and structures in Lithuania
Cathedral
Vilnius
Vilnius
Vilnius
Vilnius
Objects listed in Lithuanian Registry of Cultural Property
Neoclassical church buildings in Lithuania